The Lurgy is a small river in County Donegal, Ireland. It flows into the River Lennon near Kilmacrennan.

Rivers of County Donegal